Tô Vĩnh Lợi (born 22 April 1985) is a former Vietnamese footballer who last played as a goalkeeper for V.League 1 club Thanh Hóa and Vietnam national football team.

References

1985 births
Living people
Vietnamese footballers
Vietnam international footballers
Thanh Hóa FC players
Binh Dinh FC players
Hoang Anh Gia Lai FC players
Can Tho FC players
V.League 1 players
People from Bình Định province
Association football goalkeepers
Footballers at the 2006 Asian Games
Asian Games competitors for Vietnam